Jolanta Dorota Szymanek-Deresz (12 July 1954 – 10 April 2010) was a Polish lawyer and politician.

Szymanek-Deresz was born in Przedbórz. She was elected to Sejm on 25 September 2005, getting 9,723 votes in 16 Płock district as a candidate for the Democratic Left Alliance.

She was listed on the flight manifest of the Tupolev Tu-154 of the 36th Special Aviation Regiment carrying the President of Poland Lech Kaczyński which crashed near Smolensk-North airport near Pechersk near Smolensk, Russia, on 10 April 2010, killing all aboard.

On 16 April 2010, Szymanek-Deresz was posthumously awarded the Commander's Cross with Star of the Order of Polonia Restituta.

See also
 Members of Polish Sejm 2005–2007

References

External links
 Official site
 Jolanta Szymanek-Deresz - parliamentary page - includes declarations of interest, voting record, and transcripts of speeches.

1954 births
2010 deaths
University of Warsaw alumni
Polish women lawyers
21st-century Polish judges
Democratic Left Alliance politicians
Members of the Polish Sejm 2005–2007
Members of the Polish Sejm 2007–2011
Women members of the Sejm of the Republic of Poland
Victims of the Smolensk air disaster
Burials at Powązki Military Cemetery
Commanders with Star of the Order of Polonia Restituta
21st-century Polish women politicians
Recipients of the Order of the White Star, 1st Class
People from Radomsko County